ConSentry Networks provides intelligent switching, providing user and application control for enterprises. ConSentry access layer LAN switches understand the username, device, role, application at Layer 7, and destination for each flow and apply policy dynamically. The company's patented multi-core CPU hardware enables this intelligent switching at up to 10 Gbit/s throughput.

Jeff Prince, who co-founded Foundry Networks, is a co-founder of ConSentry. ConSentry is headquartered in Milpitas, CA and has offices throughout the world.

ConSentry Networks went out of business on August 20, 2009.

See also
 Network Access Control

External links
 Official site
 InfoWorld Review

References

Companies based in Milpitas, California
Networking companies of the United States